Feng Mengya (born 1947) is a female Chinese former international table tennis player.

Table tennis career
She won a bronze medal at the 1965 World Table Tennis Championships in the women's doubles with Li Li.

See also
 List of table tennis players
 List of World Table Tennis Championships medalists

References

Chinese female table tennis players
Living people
1947 births
Sportspeople from Wuxi
Table tennis players from Jiangsu
World Table Tennis Championships medalists